Colin Charles is a male beach volleyball player and coach from Trinidad and Tobago.

He played in the men's competition at the NORCECA Beach Volleyball Circuit 2008 partnering Jason Dennis

References

External links
 Colin Charles at Beach Volleyball Database

Year of birth missing (living people)
Living people
Trinidad and Tobago beach volleyball players
Men's beach volleyball players